Barnard's Namib day gecko (Rhoptropus barnardi), also known commonly as Barnard's slender gecko, is a species of lizard in the family Gekkonidae. The species is native to southern Africa.

Etymology
The specific name, barnardi, is in honor of South African zoologist Keppel Harcourt Barnard.

Distribution and habitat
R. barnardi is found in Angola and Namibia.

Description
R. barnardi is the smallest species in its genus.

Biology
R. barnardi is oviparous. Clutch size is two eggs. Each egg measures on average . Communal nesting sites may contain as many as 200 eggs.

References

Further reading
Gates BC (2010). "Day Geckos of Damaraland: Rhoptropus barnardi Hewitt, 1926, Rhoptropus boultoni Schmidt, 1933, and Rhoptropus diporus Haacke, 1965". Gekko 6 (1): 56–60.
Goldberg SR (2009). "Rhoptropus barnardi. Reproduction". African Herp News (48): 15–16.
Hewitt J (1926). "Descriptions of New and Little-known Lizards and Batrachians from South Africa". Annals of the South African Museum 20 (6): 413–431 + Plates XXXV–XXXVII. (Rhoptropus barnardi, new species, pp. 413–415 + Plate XXXV, figures 1–3).
Rösler H (2000). "Kommentierte Liste der rezent, subrezent und fossil bekannten Geckotaxa (Reptilia: Gekkonomorpha)". Gekkota 2: 28–153. (Rhoptropus barnardi, p. 109). (in German).

Rhoptropus
Geckos of Africa
Reptiles of Angola
Reptiles of Namibia
Reptiles of South Africa
Reptiles described in 1926
Taxa named by John Hewitt (herpetologist)